Speak a Little Louder is the second studio album released by singer-songwriter Diane Birch. The lead single is "All the Love You Got". Birch's singing and composition evokes sounds of Stevie Nicks and Fleetwood Mac. Birch's father died of cancer earlier in 2013, and she wrote the album to make sense of her past. Birch stated "Going through losing somebody was a very spiritually transformative experience to me, so some of the songs [I had initially planned for Speak a Little Louder] didn't feel relevant. Hanging on to that facet of rebellion in my past became irrelevant."

Birch wrote or co-wrote all the tracks on the album. The primary musicians on the album consists of Diane Birch on vocals, piano, keyboard, and tambourine (plus organ, Rhodes, keg, and drums), Nick Movshon on bass, and Homer Steinweiss on drum and guitar (plus bass). Other musicians to support the album are guitarists Mike Barron, Bing Ji Ling, Thomas Brenneck, James Farkas, Luke O'Malley, Mark Williams, and Tomek Miernowski, Jean-Philip Grobler on guitar and synth, Eg White on guitar and keyboard, bass players Angelo Morris and John Taylor, and Ahmir "?uestlove" Thompson on drums.  Matt "Aqualung" Hales performs all instruments on "UNFKD" and mostly all instruments on bonus song "Hold on a Little Longer".

Track listing 
All songs produced by Homer Steinweiss, except where noted.

References

External links 
 

2013 albums
Albums produced by Aqualung (musician)
Diane Birch albums
S-Curve Records albums